The men's individual skating event was held as part of the figure skating at the 1924 Winter Olympics. It was the third appearance of the event, which had previously been held at the Summer Olympics in 1908 and 1920. The competition was held on Tuesday, 29 January and on Wednesday, 30 January 1924. Eleven figure skaters from nine nations competed.

Results
Gillis Grafström successfully defended his 1920 title.

Referee:
  Alexander von Szabo de Bucs

Judges:
  Francis Pigueron
  Louis Magnus
  Hynek Kott
  J.G. Künzli
  Herbert Yglesias
  Josef Fellner
  Ernst Herz

References

External links
 Official Official Olympic Report
 sports-reference
 

Figure skating at the 1924 Winter Olympics
1924 in figure skating
Men's events at the 1924 Winter Olympics